Arine Sports Club (ASC) was created on February 10, 1954.  It is a multi-sports club based in Miye ou Miye, Lebanon.  The co-founders are: George Khoury Wakim (President), Girigi (a.k.a. Giris) Hanna Saikali, Tanous Joubran Wakim, and Nasri Youssef Wakim.  The club promotes unity, health and sportsmanship among its athletes.  The club competes in volleyball, basketball and indoor soccer (football) games .

Logo

Original logo was created featuring a lion with its palm on a volleyball and Cedar of Lebanon in the background.  In the 1990s, the logo was modified to show the lion sitting next to the volleyball and the cedar tree shown in the background. In 2016, the logo was modified to reflect the modern look.  The important thing was, the current logo like its predecessors, it preserved the founders' image of the ASC.

Mascot

The Lion is the main mascot for the club and was introduced in 2016.  It represents the strength and protection of the lion to its den.

Arena
Nasri Wakim's Arena is located in Beaula Neighborhood in Miye ou Miye, Lebanon.  Within the compound, there is Elie Michel Saikali's building.  It was named after the late Elie Saikali, an athlete and sportsman.  The building houses a GYM.

Competitions
The competitions are held against teams from adjacent villages, cities and different military branches in different games.  To name a few: Sidon, Aind Ed Delb, Maghdouche, Kafer Hata, Lebaa, Qraiyeh, Darb El Sim, Jensnaya, Baissour, Mharbiyeh, and Lebanese army.  This list is not all inclusive.

Recognitions
The teams (volleyball, basketball and indoor football) at the club won a lot of trophies and are at display. In recognition of their achievements local sponsors and politicians contribute to the success of the club..

Photos

References

External links
 
 

Basketball teams in Lebanon
Sport in Beirut
Lebanese volleyball clubs
Men's sport in Lebanon
Sidon District
1954 establishments in Lebanon
Basketball teams established in 1954
Volleyball clubs established in 1954